Mantra - Sounds into Silence is a film exploring the musical and social phenomenon of chant and response meditation directed by Georgia Wyss.

Overview
This film was produced from an original idea by its director Georgia Wyss, the editor of the award-winning Peak oil awareness film A Crude Awakening: The Oil Crash. In 2004, she began to develop her ideas on how to make a film recognising the importance of the practice of chanting mantras as a means of healing, a practice which she felt could benefit the lives of many. It features interviews and music by Deva Premal & Miten with Manose, Krishna Das, Snatam Kaur, Lama Gyurme & Jean-Philippe Rykiel, Jai Uttal, MC Yogi, C.C. White, Mirabai Ceiba, Gaura Vani, Nina Rao and Charlie Braun.

Interviews
The film includes interviews with Stephan Rechtschaffen, co-founder of the Omega Institute for Holistic Studies; Andrew B. Newberg, Director of Research at the Marcus Institute of Integrative Health and author of How Enlightenment Changes Your Brain; Sharon Gannon, co-founder of Jivamukti Yoga School; and the Susan Shannon, an interfaith minister with The Chaplaincy Institute's Interfaith Community.

Festival Awards
Winner Director's Choice after screening at the Illuminate Film Festival 2017.

Winner Documentary Feature World Cinema after screening at the Maui Film Festival 2017.

References

External links 
 
 

2017 films
Mindfulness
2017 documentary films
Spanish documentary films
2010s English-language films